Egesina davaoana is a species of beetle in the family Cerambycidae. It was described by Stephan von Breuning in 1948. It is known from the Philippines.

References

Egesina
Beetles described in 1948